FC Seoul is a South Korean professional football club based in Seoul that competes in the K League 1, the top flight of South Korean football. The club is owned by GS Sports, a subsidiary of GS Group. Since 2004, FC Seoul have played its home games at the Seoul World Cup Stadium in Seoul's Mapo District.

The club was founded as Lucky-Goldstar Football Club in 1983, by the Lucky-Goldstar Group, and was later renamed as LG Cheetahs in 1990. Due to the K League decentralization policy in 1996, the club was relocated to the Seoul's satellite city of Anyang for eight years, before returning to Seoul in 2004. FC Seoul have won six K League titles, two FA Cups, two League Cups and one Super Cup. Internationally, the club reached the AFC Champions League final on two occasions, in 2001–02 and 2013.

FC Seoul is one of the most successful and popular clubs in the K League 1, with financial backing from the GS Group. In 2012, the club was evaluated as the most valuable football brand in the K League. Their main rivals are Suwon Samsung Bluewings, with whom they contest the Super Match.

History

Founding and early years (1983–1989)

FC Seoul was officially announced on 18 August as the new club and founded on 22 December 1983, and started out in 1984 as Lucky-Goldstar Football Club, owned and financially supported by the Lucky-Goldstar Group (later renamed the LG Group), with the Chungcheong Province its franchise and Hwangso (meaning bull) as its mascot.

In order to launch the professional football club, Lucky-Goldstar Group had a preparation period from 1982 and demanded that the original franchise should be Seoul. In the 1984 season, the club finished seventh out of the eight clubs. The club fared better in the 1985 season when they won the championship with the help of Thailand national football team player Piyapong Pue-on, who was the top scorer, as well as the top assistor.

Moving to Seoul and then to Anyang (1990–2003)
From the beginning of 1988, Lucky-Goldstar Hwangso pushed forward a relocation to Seoul At the end of the 1989 season, the Korea Professional Football League (renamed as the K League in 1998), worried about the financial stability of the clubs, invited a number of clubs to play in Seoul. Thus, the Lucky-Goldstar Hwangso, which had always wanted to be based in the capital, moved to Seoul Stadium (Currently Dongdaemun Stadium) in Seoul at the end of 1989. 
The club finished first season in Seoul as champions. The club changed its name to LG Cheetahs in 1991 to mirror the LG Twins, a professional baseball team also owned by LG Group. After several seasons in Seoul, the club was forced to move in 1996, as part of the K League's decentralization policy. This policy was carried out to stimulate the growth of football in the provinces.  In addition, in 1995, Korea was bidding to host the 2002 FIFA World Cup. This warranted the construction of a soccer-specific stadium in Seoul. The three clubs based in Seoul – LG Cheetahs, Ilhwa Chunma, and Yukong Elephants did not want to recognize the decentralization policy. Ultimately, it proved necessary for the Korean government to issue an eviction order to the disaffected clubs. However, the government did guarantee if the clubs built a soccer-specific stadium in Seoul, the clubs could have a Seoul franchise and return to Seoul.

As a result, 3 clubs were evicted from Seoul to other cities. This entailed the move of the LG Cheetahs to the Anyang Sports Complex in the city of Anyang, a satellite city of Seoul, 21 km away. The club was now known as the Anyang LG Cheetahs. In the upcoming years, a solid base of supporters was formed, and it established a strong league rivalry with the Suwon Samsung Bluewings. This rivalry was partly fueled by the fact that LG Group and Samsung Group, which owned the Suwon club, were also considered rivals in the business world, especially in electronics. The club continued to grow and in 2000, they won their third Championship, behind the firepower of striker Choi Yong-Soo.

Return to Seoul and renaming to FC Seoul (2004–2006)
For the 2002 FIFA World Cup in South Korea and Japan, ten brand new stadiums of World Cup standards were built in South Korea. After the World Cup, the Korean World Cup Organizing Committee and the KFA actively supported the move of regional K League clubs into the new stadia.  This was designed to avoid or at least minimize any financial losses through having to maintain a stadium in playing condition without regular income. However, due to the previous decision by the K League to exclude any member club from being based in Seoul, Seoul World Cup Stadium remained vacant, except as a host of some international friendlies. Thus, the city government of Seoul and the KFA both actively sought for a K League club to play at the stadium to take on the cost of maintaining the stadium. Initially, it was intended to create a new club, but when it later transpired that any club playing in Seoul World Cup Stadium would have to pay partially for the construction fees of the stadium, this would have placed an unreasonable burden on a fledgling club. Thus, the KFA tried to lure one of the current clubs to Seoul. The Anyang LG Cheetahs, with the financial backing of the LG Group, who not only viewed the move back to Seoul as a way to increase its advertising presence, but had the right to come back to Seoul because it had its franchise moved by force in 1996, as part of the K League's decentralization policy. Anyang LG announced in February 2004 that it would pay the share of the construction fees (which turned out to be 15 billion won, or at that time 15 million USD). This proposed move provoked a significant amount of controversy from the Korean football fans as KFA and K League failed to launch a new football club based in Seoul due to a high Seoul franchise fee. Regardless, KFA and K League ultimately permitted relocation of Anyang LG Cheetahs.lies

Şenol Güneş years (2007–2009)

Şenol Güneş managed FC Seoul for a three-year period starting on December 8, 2006. The club started the 2007 season with three consecutive wins and a draw, including a 4–1 win over arch rivals Suwon Samsung Bluewings in the Super Match. However, FC Seoul failed to qualify for the play-off phase of the season, but the club succeeded in getting into the final of the 2007 Korean League Cup. Before the next season, Park Chu-Young, the ace of FC Seoul at that time, was transferred to Ligue 1 club Monaco. FC Seoul finished in a second-place in the K League regular season, and progressed to the play-offs. FC Seoul defeated Ulsan Hyundai in the play-off semi-final but was defeated by Suwon Samsung Bluewings in the final. Despite the loss, the club still qualified for the 2009 AFC Champions League. During the season, Dejan Damjanović scored 15 goals.

FC Seoul's 2009 AFC Champions League campaign began with a 2–1 win over Indonesian side Sriwijaya FC. In the next three games, FC Seoul obtained only one point in the matches against Gamba Osaka and Shandong Luneng. However, Seoul then defeated the title holders Gamba Osaka and qualified to the round of 16 after Sriwijaya's unexpected victory over Shandong Luneng. On June 24, 2009, FC Seoul beat Kashima Antlers 5–4 after penalties after a 0–0 draw in the round of 16 clash and advanced to the quarter-finals, but were beaten 4–3 on aggregate by Qatari club Umm Salal. FC Seoul's appearance in the AFC Champions League was its first since the Asian Club Championship era.

The Şenol Güneş era ended on November 25, 2009, with the manager returning to Trabzonspor.

K League and League Cup "double" (2010)
FC Seoul appointed Nelo Vingada as manager on December 14, 2009. Vingada won the K League and League Cup with FC Seoul. FC Seoul had 20 wins, 2 draws, and 6 defeats in the domestic league under Vingada's management.

FC Seoul recorded an attendance of 60,747 against Seongnam Ilhwa on May 5, 2010 at Seoul World Cup Stadium, which is the highest single-game attendance record in South Korean professional sports history. FC Seoul also recorded the single season (League, K League Championship, and League Cup) highest total attendance record – 546,397, and the single regular & post season (League and K League Championship) highest average attendance record of 32,576.

On August 25, 2010, FC Seoul beat Jeonbuk Hyundai Motors 3–0 to become the 2010 League Cup winners. FC Seoul were also crowned K League champions by defeating Jeju United 4–3 on aggregate in the K League Championship final, thus achieving their first "double" in the club's history. The crowd of 56,769 in the second leg also set the record of the highest attendance in K League Championship history.

On December 13, 2010, FC Seoul wanted to extend Vingada's one-year contract but FC Seoul and Vingada could not come to an agreement over the salary conditions, resulting in Vingada returning to Portugal.

AFC Champions League final and the sixth K League title (2011–2016)
FC Seoul's former player Choi Yong-soo was hired to manage the club in 2012, after previously serving as the assistant manager and caretaker for the club in 2011. In 2013, FC Seoul lost the AFC Champions League Final on away goals rule against Chinese side Guangzhou Evergrande. The AFC Champions League campaign has earned Choi Yong-soo the 2013 AFC Coach of the Year award, becoming the second South Korean in succession to win the individual accolade following the previous year's winner Kim Ho-kon. Choi left the club in June 2016.

On June 21, 2016, FC Seoul appointed Hwang Sun-hong as their eleventh manager in the club's history. On November 6, 2016, FC Seoul won their sixth K League title after defeating Jeonbuk Hyundai Motors 1–0 in the final round of the season.

A period of oscillation (2017– ) 
Hwang Sun-hong resigned on April 30, 2018. In the 2018 season, FC Seoul finished in eleventh place and had to play the K League promotion-relegation playoffs for the first time in their history. In the playoffs, they defeated Busan IPark 4–2 on aggregate, thus staying in the top flight.

On October 11, 2018, Choi Yong-soo was appointed as the twelfth manager in the club's history, having previously managed the club between 2011 and 2016.

However, Seoul, which had been under fire since the beginning of the 2020 season, was mired in five consecutive losses for the first time in 22 years, disappointing fans. This just represented the start of a pretty complicated year for the team, as they went through a long-lasting crisis both on and off the pitch: they suffered several debacles throughout the season, such as a 0-6 away defeat against Daegu in the sixth round of K League 1 and a 1-5 home defeat against Pohang in the quarter-finals of the FA Cup; some of the squad's key players, such as returning Brazilian striker Adriano (a record-breaking and prolific goalscorer in his previous spell at the club between 2015 and 2016) and Spanish defensive midfielder Osmar Barba, didn't manage to show their full potential, due to inconstant performances or injuries; following a new departure by Choi Yong-soo, three different caretakers took turns managing Seoul, with Park Hyuk-soon replacing Kim Ho-young after just a month and guiding the team to the end of the K League season (which they finished in 8th position, after participating in the relegation group), before being substituted by Lee Won-jun; under the management of this last coach, the team made a promising start in the group stage of AFC Champions League, even obtaining a thrashing 5-0 victory against Thai outfit Chiangrai United, but then proceeded to lose all of their last three matches, thus being eliminated from the tournament.

A very difficult season was made even more devastating by the tragic and unexpected passing of defender Kim Nam-chun on October 30, 2020, just a day before their last fixture of K League 1 against Incheon, which eventually featured a brief ceremony in order to pay a tribute to the late player. In that occasion, Seoul suffered a 1-0 defeat, with Costa Rican midfielder Elías Aguilar netting the only goal of the match.

Despite of all the difficulties, several players, such as club's icon Park Chu-young (top-scorer of the club with 7 goals overall), midfielder Han Seung-gyu and the aforementioned Osmar (once he had come back from injury), still managed to shine.

Club culture

Supporters
FC Seoul has a diverse fanbase, including former Lucky-Goldstar fans, LG Cheetahs fans, Anyang LG Cheetahs fans. FC Seoul's number-12 shirt is reserved for supporters of the club. The main supporter group of FC Seoul is Suhoshin (meaning "guardian deity"), formed in April 2004. There are also some minor supporter of groups

V-Girls and V-Man
V-Girls & V-Man are FC Seoul's cheerleaders. The V stands for victory. They cheerlead at the East Stand.

Stadiums

Since 2004, FC Seoul's home is the Seoul World Cup Stadium, which is the largest football-specific stadium in Asia. FC Seoul's players train at the GS Champions Park training centre, a purpose-built facility opened in 1989, located east of Seoul in the city of Guri.

In the past, FC Seoul played at Daejeon Stadium, Cheongju Civic Stadium, Cheonan Oryong Stadium (1987–1989), Dongdaemun Stadium (1990–1995), and Anyang Stadium (1996–2003).

Crests and mascots
FC Seoul has had different names, and consequently different crests for different periods of the club: Lucky-Goldstar FC (1983–1990), LG Cheetahs (1991–1995), Anyang LG Cheetahs (1996–2003).

There has also been different club mascots representing different periods. Former mascots were a bull and a cheetah. The club's current mascot, introduced in 2004, is named "SSID".

The "SSID" stands for Seoul & Sun In Dream. In the 2018 season, FC Seoul added another mascot, "Seoul-i".

A special crest for the club's 20th anniversary was used in 2003. The current crest has been used since 2004.

Kits 
FC Seoul's home kits have red-and-black stripes, as in their crest.

FC Seoul wore both red kits and yellow kits in home matches from 1984 to 1985.

From 1988 to 1994, the club's home shirt's main colour was yellow, same as the Lucky-Goldstar Group's company colour at the time.

In 1995, Lucky-Goldstar Group pushed ahead with corporate identity unification and the company colour was changed to red. As a result, FC Seoul's jersey colour was changed from yellow to red as part of the unification project.

From 1999 to 2001, FC Seoul wore red and blue stripes but returned to all red in the 2002 season and In 2005, FC Seoul changed to red and black stripes and this colour has been in use since.

In June 2016, FC Seoul released the 1984–1985 retro jersey to commemorate foundation of the club and the first K League title.

First kit summary 

Notes
(1) During 1984 season and 1985 season, FC Seoul worn red shirts and yellows shirts by turns as first kit,At that time FC Seoul did't have the concept of first kit and second kit.
(2) In the 1987 season, all K League clubs wore white shirts in home matches and coloured jerseys in away matches, like in Major League Baseball.

Kit suppliers and shirt sponsors

Kit deals

Players

Current squad

Out on loan and military service

Former players

Player records

Retired number(s)

12 – Supporters (the 12th Man)

Captains

Staff
 For details on all-time managers, see List of FC Seoul managers.

Coaching staff

Medical staff

Support staff

Honours

Domestic

League
 K League 1
Winners (6): 1985, 1990, 2000, 2010, 2012, 2016
Runners-up (5): 1986, 1989, 1993, 2001, 2008

Cups
 FA Cup
Winners (2): 1998, 2015
Runners-up (3): 2014, 2016, 2022
 League Cup
Winners (2): 2006, 2010
Runners-up (4): 1992, 1994, 1999, 2007
 Super Cup
Winners (1): 2001
Runners-up (1): 1999
 National Football Championship
Winners (1): 1988

International
 AFC Champions League
Runners-up (2): 2001–02, 2013

Records and statistics

Season-by-season records
 The 1993, 1998, 1999 and 2000 seasons had penalty shoot-outs instead of draws.

K League Championship records

K League promotion-relegation playoffs

Managerial history

 For details on all-time manager statistics, see List of FC Seoul managers.

Management

Board of Directors

Chairman history

Ownership

Popular culture
FC Seoul and FC Seoul supporters have been portrayed in a number of Korean dramas and movies:

 Dramas: Which Star Are You From, Heading to the Ground (as a fictional team called "FC Soul"), A Thousand Kisses
 Movies: Secret Romance, Dancing Queen, Running Man, Big Match, Salut d'Amour

See also
 Football in Seoul

References

External links

 Official club created
 Official website 
 Unofficial fan created
 FC Seoul Main Supporters Group 'Suhoshin' Official website 
 FC Seoul Fan's website 
 FC Seoul Online Museum 

 
K League 1 clubs
Football clubs in Seoul
Sport in Seoul
Association football clubs established in 1983
GS Group
1983 establishments in South Korea
Unrelegated association football clubs